X-Out can refer to:

 X-Out, a type of acrobatic flip
 X-Out (video game)